New Jersey's 30th Legislative District is one of 40 districts that make up the map for the New Jersey Legislature. It covers the Monmouth County municipalities of Avon-by-the-Sea, Belmar, Bradley Beach, Brielle, Farmingdale, Howell Township, Lake Como, Manasquan, Sea Girt, Spring Lake, Spring Lake Heights, and Wall Township and the Ocean County municipalities of Lakewood Township and Point Pleasant.

Demographic information
As of the 2020 United States census, the district had a population of 269,949, of whom 179,028 (66.3%) were of voting age. The racial makeup of the district was 226,943 (84.1%) White, 6,638 (2.5%) African American, 988 (0.4%) Native American, 4,395 (1.6%) Asian, 62 (0.0%) Pacific Islander, 15,059 (5.6%) from some other race, and 15,864 (5.9%) from two or more races. Hispanic or Latino of any race were 28,506 (10.6%) of the population.

The district had 168,561 registered voters , of whom 68,776 (40.8%) were registered as unaffiliated, 63,444 (37.6%) were registered as Republicans, 34,659 (20.6%) were registered as Democrats, and 1,682 (1.0%) were registered to other parties.

Political representation
For the 2022–2023 session, the district is represented in the State Senate by Robert Singer (R, Lakewood Township) and in the General Assembly by Sean T. Kean (R, Wall Township) and Ned Thomson (R, Wall Township).

The legislative district is entirely within 4th congressional district.

Apportionment history
When the 40-district legislative map was created in 1973, the 30th District was based in Essex and Hudson counties. In consisted of the Ironbound neighborhood and a part of the North Ward of Newark and Belleville in Essex County, and Harrison, East Newark, Kearny, and Secaucus in Hudson County. This district elected one of the few independents ever elected to the Legislature when in 1973, controversial Newark activist Anthony Imperiale won a term in the Senate in 1973, though he would later serve in the Assembly from the district as a Republican. In the 1980s, the 30th shifted slightly to the northwest when it encompassed Belleville, Bloomfield, Nutley, Glen Ridge, Montclair, Verona, and Cedar Grove, entirely in Essex County.

As the population began to shift away from the immediate suburbs of New Jersey cities in the 1980s, the 1991 Apportionment Commission using data collected from the 1990 Census eliminated the 30th District as it existed in Essex County and shifted it to the fast-growing areas of Burlington, Monmouth, and Ocean counties. The new 30th District created in 1991 consisted of northern corner of Burlington County including Pemberton Borough and Township, Eastampton Township, Florence Township, Bordentown City and Township, the four panhandle municipalities of Monmouth County (Allentown, Upper Freehold Township, Roosevelt, and Millstone Township), and Ocean County's Plumsted, Jackson, and Lakewood townships. Though unaffiliated voters make up most of the district, they tend to vote for the Republican candidates in this area and no Democrat has been elected to the 30th since it moved to this area. In the 2001 redistricting, municipalities in the Burlington County portion of the district were removed leaving only the ones on the edge of the county from Bordentown Township and Fieldsboro to New Hanover; Millstone Township was also removed. Added in this redistricting were Washington Township in Mercer County (renamed Robbinsville Township in 2007) and Monmouth's Howell Township and Farmingdale. The 2011 redistricting compacted the district to Lakewood, Wall, and Howell townships, and other shoreline boroughs. As a result of the district shift, incumbent Assemblyman Joseph R. Malone announced his retirement and incumbent 11th District Senator Sean T. Kean dropped down to running for an Assembly seat to avoid a primary fight with Senator Robert Singer.

Assemblyman Dave Rible resigned his seat on July 17, 2017, to become Director of the New Jersey Division of Alcoholic Beverage Control. Former Wall Township Mayor Ned Thomson was selected by local Republican committee members as a replacement from a ballot of three candidates, and was sworn in on August 24.

Election history

Election results

Senate

General Assembly

References

Monmouth County, New Jersey
Ocean County, New Jersey
30